The Star Screen Award for Most Promising Newcomer – Female is chosen by a distinguished panel of judges from the Indian Bollywood film industry and the winners are announced in January. The first woman to receive this award was Sonali Bendre.

Winners

See also
 Screen Awards
 Bollywood
 Cinema of India

References

Screen Awards
Film awards for debut actress